Pietro Anderlini, also Andorlini, (1687–1755) was an Italian painter of the Rococo period.

Biography
He was born and died in Florence. Anderlini was a pupil of Giuseppe Tonelli, and his first documented work was the fresco of the Convent of San Lorenzo in Florence in 1718. He worked alongside, and on behalf, of some of the main Florentine painters of the 1700s.

The quadratura fresco style that he painted in was widely used by contemporary painters to embellish with designs of their own works architectures, the most famous of these painters were Gerolamo Mengozzi Colonna and Giovanni Battista Tiepolo.

Works
Among the works mentioned in the eighteenth-century guides of Florence were:

 Frescoes in the basement of San Lorenzo, on the vault above the altar of the Compagnia di San Lorenzo, with architecture by Anderlini and the background by Niccolò Nannetti (completed and discovered on 17 September 1718); 
 Grotesque on the walls and vaults of the church of S. Salvatore in Vescovo; 
 Frescoes on the staircase and in the atrium that introduce the "great hall" in the archbishop's palace which was rebuilt in 1737 by Monsignor Giuseppe Martelli (architecture by Anderlini  background by Vincenzo Meucci); 
 frescoes in the church of San Giuseppe, in collaboration with Sigismondo Betti, and in the Benedictine abbey in collaboration with Onorio Marinari.

References

 Anna Maria Matteucci, Peter Anderlini: virtusismi quadraturistici in a palace of Siena, in Perspective, 1989–1990, 57–60, p. 334–339.
 Carla Costa and Annarita Stools, Pistoia e Pescia: quadraturismo centers of the Baroque period, (Thesis)
 Fauzia Farnsworth, Stefano Bertocci, The architecture of deception in Florence: illusionistic spaces in the pictorial decoration of the churches between the seventeenth and eighteenth centuries Publisher Alinea, 2002
 S. Melons Trkulja, Andorlini (Anderlini), Peter Painting in Italy. The eighteenth century, edited by G. Briganti, Milan, 2 vols., 1990 II, p. 604.
 E. Povoledo, Anderlini, Peter "Biographical Dictionary of Italians", Rome, III, 1961, p. 52.
 G.Veriani, Anderlini, Peter in "Encyclopedia of the Spectacle", Rome, 1954, I, p. 525.

Specific

17th-century Italian painters
Italian male painters
18th-century Italian painters
1687 births
1755 deaths
Painters from Florence
Quadratura painters
18th-century Italian male artists